Alessandro Gabrielloni (born 10 July 1994) is an Italian footballer who plays as a forward for Como in Serie B.

References

External links

1994 births
Living people
S.S.D. Jesina Calcio players
S.S. Maceratese 1922 players
Taranto F.C. 1927 players
A.S.D. Martina Calcio 1947 players
S.S.D. Città di Campobasso players
Cavese 1919 players
A.S. Bisceglie Calcio 1913 players
Como 1907 players
Serie D players
Serie C players
Serie B players
Italian footballers
Association football forwards